Banatsko Višnjićevo is a village in Serbia. It is situated in the Žitište municipality, in the Central Banat District, Vojvodina province. The village has a Serb ethnic majority (94.27%) and its population was 384 as of the 2002 census.

Name
The exact origin of the village name is unclear. It was either named after the  famous Serb epic poet Filip Višnjić or for the cherry tree ("višnja" in Serbian) that was founded here by the first settlers, or after the surveyor Višnjić, who performed first measuring in the settlement. In Hungarian the village is known as Vida.

Historical population

1961: 677
1971: 577
1981: 458
1991: 391

See also
List of places in Serbia
List of cities, towns and villages in Vojvodina

References

Further reading
Slobodan Ćurčić, Broj stanovnika Vojvodine, Novi Sad, 1996.

Populated places in Serbian Banat